DO-204 is a family of diode semiconductor packages defined by JEDEC. This family comprises lead-mounted axial devices with round leads.  Generally a diode will have a line painted near the cathode end.

Dimensions

Common variants 

Several common packages are archived in DO-204 as variants, and may be referred to using their alternative names.

DO-7
The DO-7 (also known as DO-204-AA) is a common semiconductor package for 1N34A germanium diodes.

DO-35
The DO-35 (also known as DO-204-AH or SOD27) is a semiconductor package used to encapsulate signal diodes (i.e., diodes meant to handle small amounts of current and voltage).  It is often used to package small signal, low power diodes such as 1N4148 (a 100 V, 300 mA silicon diode.)

DO-41
The DO-41 (also known as DO-204-AL or SOD66) is a common semiconductor package used to encapsulate rectifier diodes (i.e., diodes meant to handle larger currents and voltages than signal diodes). The name is derived from the JEDEC descriptor "Diode Outline, Case Style 41".  DO-41 diodes are larger than signal diode packages such as DO-35, which are not required to handle large currents.  The most common diode using this packaging is the 1N4001 to 1N4007 series of rectification diodes.

National standards

References

External links

 JEP95 - Registered and Standard Outlines for Solid State and Related Products, JEDEC
 DO family parts, TopLine

Semiconductor packages